The women's handball tournament at the 2012 Olympic Games in London was held from 28 July to 11 August. The preliminaries and quarter-finals were held at the Copper Box and the semi-finals and final took place at the Basketball Arena.

Twelve nations were represented in the tournament. The four best teams from each group advanced to a knockout round, while the 5th and 6th teams in each group were classified 9th–12th by the results of their group matches. Unlike in previous Olympics, there was no placement matches involving the losing teams of the quarterfinals.

Norway won the tournament and gold medal, beating Montenegro in the final. Montenegro's silver was the first Olympic medal for the country as an independent nation, and the country's only medal at the 2012 Games. Spain won the bronze medal.

Qualification

† Sweden qualified as 2010 European Championship runner up because Norway qualified as the 2011 World Champion.

Seeding
Before the draw the IHF seeded the teams in six pots. The draw for the groups was held on 30 May 2012.

Group stage

Group A

Group B

Knockout stage

Quarter-finals

Semi-finals

Bronze medal match

Gold medal match

Rankings and statistics

Final ranking

All-star team
 Goalkeeper:   Kari Aalvik Grimsbo
 Left wing:    Jo Hyo-bi
 Left back:    Bojana Popović
 Central back:  Marta Mangué
 Right back:   Katarina Bulatović
 Right wing:   Alexandra do Nascimento
 Line player:  Heidi Løke
Chosen by team officials and IHF experts: IHF.info

Top goalkeepers

Top goalscorers

References

External links 
Handball at the 2012 Summer Olympics – Women's team rosters

W
Women's handball in the United Kingdom
2012 in women's handball
2012 in English women's sport
Women's events at the 2012 Summer Olympics